Peter Jackson  is a British scholar and historian, specializing in the Crusades, particularly the contacts between the Europeans and the Mongols as well as medieval Muslim India. He is Emeritus Professor of Medieval History at Keele University and editor of The Cambridge History of Iran: The Timurid and Safavid Periods.

His main research interests are on the relations between the Mongols and the Latin West between 1220 and 1410, and he has written extensively on the topic, exploring the concepts of medieval Europe, the Crusades, medieval Russia and the Mongols, especially the clash of cultures, and the interconnectedness of legends such as that of Prester John.

Academic career
Graduating from St John's College, Cambridge, in 1971, he was awarded a PhD from Cambridge in 1977 for the thesis "The Mongols and India, 1221–1351". In 1979 he was appointed lecturer in history at Keele University, becoming a senior lecturer in 1991. He was awarded a personal chair in medieval history in 2002.

Research
His 1999 book The Delhi Sultanate was described by a reviewer as amongst the most distinguished works on the medieval Islamic world in our time  and was scheduled for translation into Arabic. In this book, the geographical extent of his scholarship, his linguistic skills, and his extensive knowledge of medieval Islamic geography enabled him to compress into a single volume a nuanced
assessment which was rooted in close textual analysis and a mastery of the linguistic problems
presented by his sources, reminiscent of the research of Simon Digby. His latest book on the Mongols and the Islamic World has been described as a work of great erudition which demonstrates Peter Jackson's life-long understanding of both the Muslim and the European sources for the history of the Mongols.
 
Jackson also held a Leverhulme Major Research Fellowship. In 2011 he retired as Professor Emeritus, and was elected a Fellow of the British Academy in 2012.

Books 

 
 
 
 
 

Translator of

Notes

References
 List of publications

External links 
 http://www.pearson.ch/HigherEducation/Longman/1449/9780582368965/The-Mongols-and-the-West-1221-1410.aspx
 http://journals.cambridge.org/production/action/cjoGetFulltext?fulltextid=856308
 http://journals.cambridge.org/production/action/cjoGetFulltext?fulltextid=988376

Living people
British historians
Year of birth missing (living people)
Academics of Keele University
Historians of the Crusades
Fellows of the British Academy
Historians of India